Career Woman is a 1936 American drama film directed by Lewis Seiler and written by Lamar Trotti. The film stars Claire Trevor, Michael Whalen, Isabel Jewell, Eric Linden, Virginia Field and Gene Lockhart. The film was released on December 18, 1936, by 20th Century Fox.

Plot

Cast
Claire Trevor as Carroll Aiken
Michael Whalen as Barry Conant
Isabel Jewell as Gracie Clay
Eric Linden as Everett Clark
Virginia Field as Fifi Brown
Gene Lockhart as Uncle Billy Burly
Edward Brophy as Doc Curley
El Brendel as Chris Erleson
Guinn "Big Boy" Williams as Bede Sanders
Sterling Holloway as George Rogers
Charles Middleton as Matt Clay
Charles Waldron as Milt Clark 
Kathleen Lockhart as Mrs. Milt Clark
Frank McGlynn, Sr. as Sheriff Duncan
June Storey as Edith Clark
Lynne Berkeley as Helen Clark
Raymond Brown as Judge Hite
George Meeker as Mr. Smith
Howard Hickman as Judge Whitman
Spencer Charters as Coroner McInery
Erville Alderson as Dr. Anderson
Eily Malyon as Miss Brinkerhoff
Otto Hoffman as Frank Jackson

References

External links 
 

1936 films
American drama films
1936 drama films
20th Century Fox films
Films directed by Lewis Seiler
American black-and-white films
Films with screenplays by Lamar Trotti
1930s English-language films
1930s American films